is the first remix album by Halcali. The title is a play on the words Halcali and Mix in order to also make the word Remix because of the katakana lack of differentiation between roman L and R characters. Therefore, the title is sometimes referred to as Halcali Remix or Halcalimix.

Track listing

CD
 
 Remixed by Yuka Honda (本田ゆか)
 
 Remixed by Takkyu Isshino (石野卓球)
 
 Remixed by Yasuyuki Okamura (岡村靖幸)
 
 Remixed by Halfby
 
 Remixed by Force of Nature
 
 Remixed by K・U・D・O
 
 from Magokoro Covers (Produced by Kohei Japan (Mellow Yellow))
 "Peek-A-Boo (DJ Mitsu the Beats remix)"
 Remixed by DJ Mitsu the Beats
 
 Remixed by Hiroshi Kawanabe of Tokyo No.1 Soul Set
 "Baby Blue! (Baby Blue Is Good Mix)"
 Remixed by Your Song Is Good
 "Halcali Beat Edition"
 (Bonus Track) Edited by Halfby

Halcali albums
Remix albums by Japanese artists
2005 remix albums